John Ogwen (born 25 April 1944) is a Welsh actor.

Early life
Ogwen was born and raised in Sling near Bethesda in the Ogwen Valley, from which his surname derives. He attended Ysgol Dyffryn Ogwen, then studied English and Welsh at the University College of North Wales.  When told by his agent, "You'll have to make up your mind whether you want to be a nationalist or an actor", he replied, "I'll be a bit of both."

Career
He is best known to British audiences for his starring role in the 1978 drama series Hawkmoor, and appearances in the television series The District Nurse and the Doctor Who serial Revelation of the Daleks, Ogwen has been a stalwart of Welsh language television and film since the early 1970s.  He has also written plays, presented documentary series and recorded readings of Welsh-language works.

In 2004 he was awarded a BAFTA Cymru Special Award for his contribution to Welsh television and film.

Personal life
Ogwen has a keen interest in football, and played as a striker for Bangor City when still in the sixth form at school.  Today he is a keen Everton supporter.

He is married to Maureen Rhys, one of Wales' most recognisable actresses, and in the past they have frequently worked together in productions.  They have three children, and live in Bangor.

Partial filmography

Films
Blood Circle (1994)
Oed yr Addewid (2002)
Eldra (2002)

Television
Hawkmoor (1978)
The District Nurse (1984)
Doctor Who (1985)
Deryn (1985)
Tomos y Tanc a'i Ffrindiau (1986) - narrator (Welsh language version of Thomas the Tank Engine & Friends)
Tylluan Wen (1997)
Belonging (2005)
Y Gwyll (2015)

References

External links
 
 BBC profile (in Welsh)

Welsh male television actors
Welsh male actors
Living people
1944 births
People from Gwynedd
People educated at Ysgol Dyffryn Ogwen
Alumni of Bangor University
Welsh-speaking actors